Penicillium tulipae is a species of fungus in the genus Penicillium which produces penicillic acid, roquefortine C, roquefortine D, terrestric acid, glandicoline A, glandicoline B, meleagrin, oxaline, penitrem A and epineoxaline.

References

Further reading 
 
 
 

tulipae
Fungi described in 2003